Ischaemum is taxonomically one of the most formidable genera in the huge tribe Andropogoneae, belonging to the grass family, widespread in tropical and semitropical regions in many countries. Many species are known commonly as murainagrass.

In 2022, Shahid Nawaz (an agrostologist, The Blatter Herbarium (BLAT)) described an extremely unusual species in the genus characterised by its dioecious breeding system, it was named as Ischaemum dioecum Landge & R.D. Shinde. This species is strictly narrow endemic to a couple of locations in Western Ghats of Raigad district, Maharashtra, India. The male and female plants are sexually separate individuals and occupy the similar ecological niches. This is the only dioecious species in the entire tribe Andropogoneae in the world.

Species

Formerly included
numerous species now regarded as better suited to other genera: Andropogon, Andropterum, Apocopis, Arundinella, Bothriochloa, Coelorachis, Crypsis, Echinochloa, Eremochloa, Eulaliopsis, Kerriochloa, Lasiurus, Manisuris, Microstegium, Phacelurus, Pogonatherum, Polytrias, Rhytachne, Rottboellia, Sehima, Stenotaphrum, Thuarea, Triplopogon, Tripsacum, Vossia

References

 
Poaceae genera
Taxa named by Carl Linnaeus
Taxonomy articles created by Polbot
Andropogoneae